Fatimah bint Sa’d Al Āmri Al-Zahrani, was the paternal great-great-great-great-grandmother and maternal great-great-great-grandmother of Islamic prophet Muhammad. Her full name is: Fatimah bint Sa’d bin Sail bin Khair bin Hamālah bin Oaf bin Ghanam bin Āmir (banu Āmir) bin Amro bin Gha’thamah bin Gha’thamah bin Yashkor bin Mobsher bin Sa’b bin Dahman bin Nasr bin Zahran bin Ka’ab bin Al-Harith bin Ka’ab bin Abdullah Mālik bin Nasr bin Azd.

Biography
Fatima bint Sa’d was daughter of Sa’d of Banu Āmir of Zahran (An ancient off-shoot of Azd) in Hejaz, specifically in Al-Baha. She married Kilab ibn Murrah and bore him two sons. Her elder son, Zuhrah ibn Kilab, was the progenitor of the Banu Zuhrah clan, and her younger son, Qusai ibn Kilab, became the first Quraysh custodian of the Ka'aba. After Kilab ibn Murrah's death she married Rabi‘ah ibn Haram from the Bani Azra tribe, who took her with him to as-Sham, where she gave birth to a son called Darraj.

Family tree

 * indicates that the marriage order is disputed
 Note that direct lineage is marked in bold.

See also
Family tree of Muhammad

References

Year of death unknown
Year of birth unknown
4th-century women
4th-century Arabs
Ancestors of Muhammad
Sahabah ancestors
Azd